Schnaus is a former municipality in the district of Surselva in the Swiss canton of Graubünden.  On 1 January 2014 the former municipalities of Schnaus, Castrisch, Ilanz, Ladir, Luven, Pitasch, Riein, Ruschein, Sevgein, Duvin, Pigniu, Rueun and Siat merged into the new municipality of Ilanz/Glion.

History
Schnaus is first mentioned about 840 as Scanaues.

Geography
Of this area, 58.4% is used for agricultural purposes, while 30.9% is forested. Of the rest of the land, 2.3% is settled (buildings or roads) and the remainder (8.4%) is non-productive (rivers, glaciers or mountains).

The former municipality is located in the Ilanz sub-district of the Surselva district.  It consists of the village of Schnaus above the Vorderrhein and the exclave of Alp da Schnaus eastward above the Val da Siat.

Demographics
Schnaus had a population (as of 2011) of 123.  , 17.6% of the population was made up of foreign nationals.  Over the last 10 years the population has grown at a rate of 43%.  Most of the population speaks Romansh(45.5%), with German being second most common (40.4%) and Serbo-Croatian  being third (11.1%).

, the gender distribution of the population was 57.9% male and 42.1% female.  The age distribution, in Schnaus is; 17 children or 17.2% of the population are between 0 and 9 years old and 14 teenagers or 14.1% are between 10 and 19.  Of the adult population, 4 people or 4.0% of the population are between 20 and 29 years old.  21 people or 21.2% are between 30 and 39, 14 people or 14.1% are between 40 and 49, and 11 people or 11.1% are between 50 and 59.  The senior population distribution is 9 people or 9.1% of the population are between 60 and 69 years old, 8 people or 8.1% are between 70 and 79, there is 1 person who is between 80 and 89.

In the 2007 federal election the most popular party was the SVP which received 46.7% of the vote.  The next three most popular parties were the CVP (21.3%), the FDP (16.7%) and the SP (15.3%).

In Schnaus about 57.7% of the population (between age 25-64) have completed either non-mandatory upper secondary education or additional higher education (either university or a Fachhochschule).

Schnaus has an unemployment rate of 4.89%.  , there were 12 people employed in the primary economic sector and about 5 businesses involved in this sector.  2 people are employed in the secondary sector and there is 1 business in this sector.  10 people are employed in the tertiary sector, with 3 businesses in this sector.

The historical population is given in the following table:

References

External links
 

Ilanz/Glion
Former municipalities of Graubünden